The Naval Service is the maritime component of the Defence Forces of Ireland and is one of the three branches of the Irish Defence Forces. Its base is in Haulbowline, County Cork.

Though preceded by earlier maritime defence organisations, the Naval Service was formed in 1946. Since the 1970s a major role of the Naval Service has been the provision of fisheries protection in Ireland's exclusive economic zone (EEZ). Other roles include sea patrol, surveillance, and smuggling prevention. Occasionally the service undertakes longer missions in support of other elements of the Defence Forces, Irish peacekeepers serving with the United Nations, or humanitarian and trade missions.

Since July 2017 the Naval Service has participated in the European External Action Service mission which focuses a number of EU navies on humanitarian and training roles in the Mediterranean. This mission entitled "EU Navfor Med" is the first time Ireland has taken part in a multi-role and multi-national naval operation.

Ships in the Irish Naval Service are designated with the ship prefix of Long Éireannach (Irish Ship), which is abbreviated to LÉ.

History

Coastal and Marine Service 

The Anglo-Irish Treaty of 1921 stipulated that the Irish Free State, which in the event came into being in December 1922, was to be given the responsibility to police its customs and fishing, while Britain and its Royal Navy would remain in control of Irish waters.

In 1923, the Coastal and Marine Service (CMS) was created, and one year later it was disbanded.

During the Irish Civil War, in August 1922, a ship belonging to the British & Irish Steam Packet Company, Lady Wicklow, led by Captain Patrick Ryan, was used to bring Irish National Army troops around the coast to Fenit, the port of Tralee, in County Kerry. This naval involvement technically preceded the foundation of the Irish state, as at the time Ireland was still part of the United Kingdom of Great Britain and Ireland. Built-in 1890 in Dublin Dockyard, the ship measured . In all, 450 troops, including officers, were landed. Tralee was later captured from local republican forces.

, formerly the British armed steam yacht Helga, which had been used by the Royal Navy to shell Dublin during the 1916 rising, was the only CMS ship during this period. The CMS ship Muirchu continued to patrol Irish fisheries. Muirchu was re-armed in 1936 and purchased by the Irish government on advice of members of the later named Maritime Institute of Ireland for fisheries protection.

In 1938, the United Kingdom handed over the three treaty ports (Cork Harbour, Bere Haven and Lough Swilly). Consequently, the Royal Navy withdrew from Cork Harbour in July 1938. Fort Rannoch was added to the Irish fleet at that time.

Marine and Coastwatching Service 

In 1939 the Irish Government ordered two motor torpedo boats (MTBs) from Vosper Thorneycroft. When World War II began in September 1939 the Marine and Coastwatching Service was set up. In order for Ireland to remain neutral, it became clear that a full naval service would be required. The government consequentially ordered an additional four MTBs. By the end of 1940 the Irish Marine and Coastwatching Service consisted of six MTBs and four other assorted craft.

During the war the service protected fisheries, regulated merchant ships, and laid mines off Cork and Waterford.

In June 1940, an Irish Marine and Coastwatching Service MTB returned to Haulbowline after making two trips to rescue British and French soldiers during the Dunkirk evacuation.

By 1941 the Marine and Coastwatching Service consisted of 10 craft (6 MTBs plus 4 assorted vessels) and about 300 all ranks. In 1942, the service was renamed the Marine Service.

Naval Service 

In September 1946, the Marine Service was formally disbanded and the Naval Service established as a permanent component of the Irish Defence Forces. The Naval Service purchased three s from the United Kingdom in 1946 and 1947. These three ships were to become a key part of the Naval Service in the 1950s and 1960s. The first formal training of Irish naval cadets took place at the Britannia Royal Naval College, Dartmouth, UK, in 1947. In 1970, Cliona and Macha were withdrawn from service and scrapped, leaving Maev as the sole ship in the Naval Service. Maev was withdrawn from service in 1972. In 1971, the Naval Service commissioned three armed s: Grainne, Banba and Fola.

In 1971, the Naval Service commissioned Verolme Cork Dockyard to build an offshore patrol ship. Named , it was the first naval vessel purpose-built in Ireland to patrol its waters. The subsequent strain put on the Naval Service prompted funding from the European Economic Community to acquire five additional vessels, four of which were eventually built. Meanwhile, the former Irish lights vessel Isolda was purchased to act as a training ship, bearing the pennant number A15 and renamed . It served until being sold for scrap in 1984. A Danish stern trawler Helen Basse was also leased for a year, serving under the name LÉ Ferdia, pennant number A16.

The 50th anniversary of the Naval Service took place in 1996. Celebrations included a fleet review by President Mary Robinson.

While most missions undertaken by the Naval Service are in Irish waters, on occasion longer missions are undertaken in support of Irish peacekeepers serving with the United Nations, representing Ireland, or in support of Irish trade missions. In 2002, LÉ Niamh delivered supplies to Irish troops in Eritrea, then continued on a trade promotional tour to India, Malaysia, Singapore, Hong Kong, China, Korea, and Japan, becoming the first Irish naval vessel to cross the Equator. In 2006  travelled to Argentina, attending ceremonies connected with the 149th anniversary of the death of Irish-born Admiral William Brown, founder of the Argentine Navy, and also visited ports in Uruguay and Brazil. In 2010, Niamh travelled to the Americas, visiting Brazil, Argentina, Chile, Mexico and the United States.

In 2010, two new ships were planned for the Naval Service. The first, was delivered in April 2014 replacing LÉ Emer, and the second, LÉ James Joyce, replaced LÉ Aoife in 2015. The option for a third, LÉ William Butler Yeats, was exercised in June 2014 and commissioned in October 2016. The new ships displace over 1,900 tons, have a top speed of 23 knots, a range of 6,000 nautical miles. They are armed with an OTO Melara 76 mm/62, and have a longer deck area that can accommodate deep-sea search-and-rescue submarines and unmanned aircraft.

In May 2015, it was announced that the Naval Service would deploy a ship to the Mediterranean to form part of the EU humanitarian response to the European migrant crisis. The fleet flagship, Eithne, left Cork on 16 May 2015 for an eight-week deployment to the region, during which time the ship picked up a total of 3,377 people in the waters between Libya and Sicily. In July, the mission was extended with the deployment of first, Niamh from July to September, and then Samuel Beckett from September until November.

In July 2022, in advance of the proposed arrival of a number of replacement vessels, the fleet's three oldest vessels (Eithne, Orla, Ciara) were decommissioned. Two other vessels (Róisín, Niamh) were placed in "operational reserve" in January 2023.

Organisation

Naval Headquarters 

The Naval Service is headed by Flag Officer Commanding the Naval Service (FOCNS) Commodore Michael Malone who is based at Naval Headquarters (NHQ) in Naval Base Haulbowline. NHQ oversees all aspects of the Naval Service, with a number of commands under it: Naval Operations Command (NOC) and Naval Support Command (NSC). The Naval College, like the DFTC is of an equal footing with the two commands, with all three headed by an officer commanding who report directly to the FOCNS of NHQ. Commodore Malone is the first marine engineer to be appointed as FOCNS, his prior appointment was as Officer Commanding Naval Support Command (OCNSC).

Naval Operations Command 

Naval Operations Command is the principal command component of the Irish Naval Service responsible for all day-to-day activities of the service, both at sea and on shore. One of three major command components of the NS this command is responsible for overseeing the work and mission objectives of all Irish naval vessels at sea who report directly to Naval Operations Command at Naval Base Haulbowline. The command is a direct subordinate to NHQ and is overseen by Officer Commanding Naval Operations Command (OCNOC). The OCNOC reports directly to the head of the Irish Naval Service, the FOCNS.

Naval Support Command 

Naval Support Command oversees the personnel, logistical and technical resources of the NS, allowing the service to meets its operational and training commitments. Ship procurement, maintenance, repair, provisions, ordnance, food, fuel, personnel and transportation are handled by Naval Support Command. Naval Support Command is headed by Officer Commanding Naval Support Command and reports directly to the FOCNS.

Naval College 

The Naval College is the principal naval military college in Ireland providing training to cadets, NCO's and recruits of the Irish Naval Service.  The Naval College trains and educates personnel for service, providing a mixture of different courses ranging from officer training right through to Naval Engineering. The Naval College is based out of the Naval Service's headquarters at Naval Base Haulbowline but also provides classes and lessons in non-military naval training at the nearby National Maritime College of Ireland (NMCI) in Ringaskiddy.

The Naval College contains a number of schools providing specialist courses including the Officer Training School, the Military and Naval Operational Training School and the School of Naval Engineering. The Officer Commanding Naval College reports directly to the FOCNS.

Specialist units 

The Naval Service has a number of specialist units that handle unique and varied tasks within the service.

Diving Section 

The Naval Service Diving Section (NSDS) (Irish: Rannóg Tumadóireachta na Seirbháse Cabhlaigh), formally part of NOC's shore operations section, is a specialist unit of the Irish Naval Service, a branch of the Defence Forces, the military of Ireland. The Naval Service Diving Section specialises in underwater diving tasks for the Naval Service, and since its formation in 1964 has become Ireland's most advanced diving team, aiding other state agencies in various specialist roles.

Various mission roles of the NSDS include search and recovery, underwater survey, explosive ordnance disposal (EOD) underwater engineering and military diving training. They have conducted combat diving training for Army Ranger Wing members after selecting combat diving as a speciality.

Naval Intelligence Cell 

The Naval Intelligence Cell, part of the NOC's Intelligence and Fisheries Section, is responsible for the collection, collation and dissemination of naval intelligence and is the naval component of the Defence Forces' Directorate of Military Intelligence.

Fishery Monitoring Centre 

The Fishery Monitoring Centre, part of the NOC's Intelligence and Fisheries Section, oversees the identification, monitoring and surveillance of fisheries vessels in Irish waters as part of the Vessel Monitoring System. The Fishery Monitoring Centre coordinates with fisheries agencies in other countries.

Roles and capabilities 

The Naval Service's military roles and the functions it carries out are more those of a coast guard rather than that of a conventional navy. Lacking both anti-submarine and anti-aircraft capabilities, and without standoff weapons such as surface-to-surface missiles, the Naval Service's ability to control Ireland's territorial waters and provide close naval support is extremely limited. Sea lift is also limited and ad hoc. The Naval Service's non-military capabilities in aid to the civil power and other government departments is fishery protection, search and rescue, drugs interdiction and dive support.

Irish territorial waters and EEZ 
This was increased to  again in 1994 when the introduction of the exclusive economic zone (EEZ) gave approval to the 1982 United Nations Convention on the Law of the Sea (UNCLOS). This convention grants the state sovereign rights over the seabed, its subsoil and the water adjacent to the seabed within the 200 nautical mile limit.

Negotiations are taking place that could see the influence of coastal states extended beyond the 200 nautical miles of EEZs. In 2007, Ireland became the first country to gain approval for the extension of its continental shelf, to the west of the island, and now has responsibility for an area of some  – an increase of 100 per cent.

Among the tasks mandated to the NSDS include the following;
 Search and recovery
 Underwater survey
 Explosive ordnance disposal
 Underwater engineering
 Military diving training

EU Navfor Med

In July 2017, the Irish government agreed to allowing the Naval Service to join other EU member state navies in Operation Sophia (the EU operation focused on refugee smuggling in the Mediterranean). Since 2015 the Irish Navy has had bilateral agreement called Operation Pontus with the Italian Navy in regards to Mediterranean search and rescue operations. In order for Ireland to join the mission it required the passing of the so-called "triple lock system". This requires cabinet, Dáil and UN approval.
In its previous stance the Irish Navy was limited in its remit and sourcing of intelligence due to its lack of participation in EU Navfor Med. There was also a lack of force protection in the event of an attack on Irish vessels but this changed with the go-ahead for EU participation.

Assets 

Until 2014, all Naval Service vessels had been named with (mainly female) names taken from Celtic mythology and Irish folklore. However, the four newest in the fleet, LÉ Samuel Beckett (commissioned 17 May 2014), LÉ James Joyce (commissioned in September 2015), LÉ William Butler Yeats (commissioned 17 October 2016) and LÉ George Bernard Shaw (commissioned 30 April 2019) take their names from Irish literary figures. The ship prefix LÉ stands for Long Éireannach, "Irish Ship" in the Irish language.

Current fleet

Other assets 

The Naval Service also operates smaller training vessels and rigid-hulled inflatable boats.

Air assets to support naval patrols are provided by the Air Corps with their two CASA CN-235 maritime patrol aircraft and AW139 helicopters operated from Casement Aerodrome, Baldonnel, County Dublin.

In July 2015, the Irish Naval Service began using an Irish-based satellite communications system for its fleet, with new systems and equipment installed on all vessels. The Irish National Space Centre (NSC) at Elfordstown, Midleton, County Cork, and County Wicklow based company Voyager IP  provided the contract.

Acquisitions and future 

In October 2010, contracts were signed for two new "offshore patrol vessels" (OPVs). The contract provided an option for a third vessel – which was later taken-up. A fourth vessel in the same class was ordered in June 2016. Constructed by Babcock Marine in the UK to VARD Marine's PV90 design, the first ship, Samuel Beckett, was delivered in May 2014. The second ship, James Joyce, was delivered in 2015. The third, William Butler Yeats, was floated out in March 2016 and delivered later that summer. A fourth, named George Bernard Shaw, was delivered in late 2018, and commissioned in April 2019. These Samuel Beckett-class OPVs replaced older vessel classes, such as the Emer class.

A number of these purchases were informed by a Whitepaper on Defence which expected acquisition of three new naval vessels over 10 years from 2015 to 2025. As well as the acquired and ordered OPVs, the whitepaper covered a multi-role vessel (MRV) – which would be potentially enabled for helicopter operations and have a freight carrying capacity – to replace the flagship LÉ Eithne.

In 2017, a delegation of Department of Defence (DoD) officials and members of the Defence Forces visited New Zealand to inspect the Royal New Zealand Navy (RNZN) multi-role vessel ; it was suggested that a vessel of this type, capable of accommodating and deploying a full infantry company either by landing craft or helicopter, and with a fully equipped hospital, was what the Defence Forces were looking for, for the type of military and humanitarian missions undertaken by Ireland. Plans expected that LÉ Ciara and LÉ Orla be replaced with similar vessels, but with counter-mine and counter-IED capabilities. In August 2021, the Irish Examiner reported that the DoD was considering acquiring two former RNZN Lake-class inshore patrol vessels. If acquired, it was speculated that these vessels would be based on the east coast and operate mainly in the Irish Sea with the primary role of fisheries protection in light of Brexit. By March 2022, the DoD had confirmed the acquisition of two such retired RNZN vessels, HMNZS Rotoiti and HMNZS Pukaki, for €26 million. As of early 2023, the ships were due be transported from New Zealand to Ireland during 2023 and to enter service in 2024. The two vessels are intended to replace LÉ Orla and LÉ Ciara and reportedly require less crew to operate.

Decommissioned 

The following vessels have served in the service's fleet:
  (1946–1970)
  (1946–1972)
  (1947–1970)
  (1971–1987)
  (1971–1984)
  (1971–1987)
  (1972–2001)
  (1976–1984)
  (1977–1978)
  (1978–2013)
  (1979–2015)
  (1980–2016)
  (1984–2022)
  (1989–2022)
  (1989–2022)

Weapons

Personnel and ranks 

As of May 2016, there were 1,094 personnel of all ranks in the Naval Service, plus approximately 150 in the Naval Service Reserve. The Naval Service is headed by a general officer commanding (GOC) known as the "flag officer commanding the naval service" (FOCNS), who holds the rank of commodore. Non-military training takes place alongside Mercantile Marine personnel at the National Maritime College of Ireland in Ringaskiddy, near to the Haulbowline base.

See also 
 Irish Coast Guard
 Marine Institute Ireland
 List of Irish state vessels
 List of navies

Footnotes

External links 

 Official Defence Forces website
 Official Naval Service website
 Maritime Institute of Ireland – History

1946 establishments in Ireland
 
Military of the Republic of Ireland